Kováč, feminine: Kováčová, is a surname in Slovakia.

It may refer to:

 Kováč
 Alan Kováč (born 1993), Slovak footballer
 Dušan Kováč (born 1942), Slovak historian
 Ervín Kováč (1911–1972), Slovak footballer
 Henrich Kováč (born 1994), Slovak footballer
 Igor Kováč (born 1969), Slovak athlete
 Ivan Kováč (1948-2023), Slovak athlete
 Lukáš Kováč (born 1987), Slovak footballer
 Maroš Kováč (born 1977), Slovak cyclist
 Matej Kováč (born 1985), Slovak footballer
 Michal Kováč (1930–2016), President of Slovakia
 Pavel Kováč (born 1974), Slovak footballer
 Radoslav Kováč (born 1979), Czech footballer
 Tibor Kováč (1905–1952), Slovak Jewish activist
 Vladimír Kováč (born 1991), Slovak footballer

 Kováčová
 Alena Kováčová (born 1978), Slovak basketball player
 Emília Kováčová (born 1931), First Lady of Slovakia
 Ivana Kováčová (born 1992), Slovak gymnast
 Kateřina Kováčová (born 1982), Czech poet
 Lenka Kováčová (born 1966), Czech rower

Slovak-language surnames